Six (stylised in all uppercase) is a British musical comedy with music, book, and lyrics by Toby Marlow and Lucy Moss. It is a modern retelling of the lives of the six wives of Henry VIII, presented in the form of a pop concert. In the show, each of the wives (Catherine of Aragon, Anne Boleyn, Jane Seymour,  Anna of Cleves, Katherine Howard, and Catherine Parr) take turns telling their story, to see who suffered the most due to Henry VIII. 

The musical premiered at the Edinburgh Festival Fringe in 2017, where it was performed by students from Cambridge University. Six premiered on the  West End in January 2019, and has since embarked on a UK tour. An Australian production opened at the Sydney Opera House in January 2020. It premiered on  Broadway in March 2020 and, following a hiatus due to the COVID-19 pandemic, officially opened at the Lena Horne Theatre on 3 October 2021. Two North American tours, dubbed the "Aragon" and "Boleyn" tours began in 2022.

Plot 

The six Queens introduce themselves performing at a pop concert, telling the audience that the position of the band's lead singer will be the prize for whoever they determine had the worst experience at the hands of their common husband, Henry VIII ("Ex-Wives"). Catherine of Aragon recounts how Henry wished to annul their marriage and place her in a nunnery when he began chasing after Anne Boleyn despite being loyal to him during their marriage, much to her anger ("No Way"). In turn, Anne talks about how Henry wanted her instead but she did not really want him. Then complains of the infidelity Henry partook in, which led to Anne flirting with other men to make him jealous and ending up dead/beheaded but somehow covers her trauma and feelings with jokes and silly faces. ("Don't Lose Ur Head"). Jane Seymour steps up to take her turn, but is ridiculed for having had an easy time with Henry. However, while admitting she may have been the only wife Henry truly loved, Jane claims that his love was conditional on her having produced a male heir, and that she stood by him despite his many faults ("Heart of Stone").

Themes relating to ideas of female beauty are explored in Hans Holbein's portrait studio. The Queens parody an dating app by presenting a choice of three potential brides for Henry ("Haus of Holbein"). He chooses Anna of Cleves, but soon rejects her and annuls the marriage, suggesting she failed to resemble her “profile picture”. She makes a show of complaining about living in a beautiful palace in Richmond with an enormous fortune and no man to tell her what to do, but in reality, ends up bragging about it ("Get Down"). The Queens question this, and Anna admits her lavish lifestyle lacked actual tragedy. The Queens then belittle Katherine Howard for being "the least relevant Catherine", but in retaliation she enumerates flaws in the others' claims to winning. She then recounts her romantic history, having had many suitors even as a child, and at first relishes her attractiveness; however, she soon reveals the emotional trauma and abuse she faced in each of these relationships as it is symbolized in the choreography with all the queens holding a hand on her("All You Wanna Do").

As the Queens continue to fight over who is the true winner, Catherine Parr questions the point of the competition, which defines them by their connection to Henry rather than as individuals. The Queens nonetheless continue to argue. Frustrated, Parr recalls her separation from her lover, Sir Thomas Seymour, and arranged marriage with Henry, but instead of lamenting, she acknowledges her accomplishments independent of Henry ("I Don't Need Your Love"). The other Queens, realising they have been robbed of their individuality, abandon the contest and declare that they don't need Henry's love to feel validated as people. They use their remaining moments onstage to rewrite their stories, singing together as a group rather than as solo artists, and writing their own 'happily ever afters', had Henry never been involved ("Six"). They then perform a mashup of songs that appeared earlier in the show (excluding "Haus of Holbein") in which the audience have their permission to record ("Megasix").

Development 

In late 2016, Toby Marlow was selected by the Cambridge University Musical Theatre Society to create and write a new musical that would be presented at the Edinburgh Fringe Festival in 2017. Marlow, who was in his final year at Cambridge University, created a concept for a musical that would involve re-telling the story of King Henry VIII's ex-wives. He partnered with another student, Lucy Moss, who began working on a concept for the musical together. 

As they began working on the musical, Marlow researched the ex-wives stories by reading Antonia Fraser's The Six Wives of Henry VIII, while Moss viewed a documentary series, Six Wives by Lucy Worsley. They also watched and drew inspiration from the 2011 Beyoncé concert and story-telling performance, Live at Roseland: Elements of 4. The foundation for the musical was written over the course of approximately 10 nonconsecutive days.

In developing the characters, Marlow and Moss were inspired by several real-life pop stars who were used as a  composite and musical inspiration for the characters.The six ex-wives and their corresponding pop star inspirations are:

 Catherine of Aragon: is modelled after a mixture of Beyoncé, Jennifer Lopez, and Jennifer Hudson
 Anne Boleyn: includes elements of Miley Cyrus, Avril Lavigne, and Lily Allen 
 Jane Seymour: is reminiscent of Adele, Sia, and Celine Dion. 
 Anna of Cleves: includes elements of Nicki Minaj and Rihanna.
  Katherine Howard: is a blend of young, sexualized pop stars and includes elements of Britney Spears and Ariana Grande. 
 Catherine Parr: inspired by Alicia Keys and Emeli Sandé.

Production history

Edinburgh Fringe (2017) 
The world premiere production of "Six" took place at the Edinburgh Festival Fringe, as a presentation by the Cambridge University Musical Theatre Society.  The musical ran from 31 July 2017 until 14 October 2017. The cast consisted of students from Cambridge University. The production's run was sold-out, and led to the musical being invited to return to the Edinburgh Fringe in 2018.

Pre-West End tour (2018) 

Based on the success of the Edinburgh Fringe production, the musical attracted the attention of producers Kenny Wax and Global Musicals, who were interested in commercial productions of the show. Six had its first professional production at the Arts Theatre in  London's West End, where it performed only on Monday evenings. Performances began on 18 December 2017. Although initially only scheduled for four performances, the production was eventually increased to six performances. The cast included Renée Lamb as Catherine of Aragon, Christina Modestou as Anne Boleyn, Natalie Paris as Jane Seymour, Genesis Lynea as Anna of Cleves, Aimie Atkinson as Katherine Howard, and Izuka Hoyle as Catherine Parr.

Following this, Six embarked on a brief tour across the UK between 11 July 2018 and 30 December 2018. Paris and Atkinson reprised their roles as Jane Seymour and Katherine Howard, respectively, with Jarnéia Richard-Noel, Millie O'Connell, Alexia McIntosh, and Maiya Quansah-Breed joining the cast. The tour included engagements at the Norwich Playhouse, a return engagement at the Edinburgh Fringe Festival, a return engagement to the Arts Theatre in London, and performances in Glasgow.

West End (2019–present) 

Six officially made its  West End premiere at the Arts Theatre on 17 January 2019. All of the cast members from the 2018 touring production reprised their roles in the original West End production, which was directed by Lucy Moss and Jamie Armitage. Performances were suspended in March 2020, because of the COVID-19 pandemic.

On 5 December 2020, Six resumed performances, but this time playing at the Lyric Theatre. Despite the COVID-19 restrictions implemented in London theatres, performances were once again forced to stop on 14 December 2020. 

On 21 May 2021, Six reopened for a second time at the Lyric Theatre. The musical finished its residency at the Lyric Theatre on 29 August 2021. It then transferred West End theatres and reopened at the Vaudeville Theatre on 29 September 2021.

UK tour (2019–present)
In May 2019, it was announced that Six would embark on a UK tour that would begin in October 2019. Principal casting for the tour was announced in September 2019, which included Lauren Drew as Catherine of Aragon, Maddison Bulleyment as Anne Boleyn, Lauren Byrne as Jane Seymour, Shekinah McFarlane as Anna of Cleves, Jodie Steele as Katherine Howard, and Athena Collins as Catherine Parr.

The tour opened on 24 October 2019 at the Yvonne Arnaud Theatre in Guildford. The tour was initially announced with over 20 stops, scheduled from October 2019 through at least July 2020. However, the tour was suspended in March 2020 due to the COVID-19 pandemic with plans to resume the tour once the shutdown ended. Amidst the pandemic, plans emerged for a drive-in style tour across the UK beginning in June 2020. However, those plans were later cancelled due to further COVID-19 shutdown restrictions. 

On 8 June 2021, the UK tour of Six resumed, with performances beginning in Canterbury.

Pre-Broadway tour (2019) 
In December 2018, it was announced that Six would make its North American premiere at the Chicago Shakespeare Theater in May 2019, as a pre-Broadway engagement. The cast included Adrianna Hicks as Catherine of Aragon, Andrea Macasaet as Anne Boleyn, Abby Mueller as Jane Seymour, Brittney Mack as Anna of Cleves, Samantha Pauly as Katherine Howard, and Anna Uzele as Catherine Parr.

The tour opened on 14 May 2019 at the Chicago Shakespeare Theatre, where it played for an extended run and broke box office records. In late August 2019, another engagement was held at the American Repertory Theater in Cambridge. It made its Canadian premiere at Edmonton's Citadel Theatre in November 2019. A final engagement was held at the Ordway Center for the Performing Arts in St. Paul, Minnesota.

Norwegian Cruise Line productions (2019–present) 
In August 2019, the Norwegian Cruise Line announced that productions of Six would be performed on their cruise ships. The first performances began in September 2019 on the Norwegian Bliss, with a second production beginning in November 2019 on the Norwegian Breakaway. A third production was scheduled to begin in April 2020, but all productions were paused in March 2020 due to the COVID-19 pandemic.

Performances on the Norwegian Breakaway and Norwegian Bliss resumed in September 2021 and October 2021, respectively.

Australia (2020/2021–2023) 
Six had its Australian premiere at the Sydney Opera House, in January 2020, starring Chloé Zuel (Aragon), Kala Gare (Boleyn), Loren Hunter (Seymour), Kiana Daniele (Cleves), Courtney Monsma (Howard), and Vidya Makan (Parr) with Ella Burns, Karis Oka and Shannen Alyce Quan as swings.   The production was originally planned to tour to Melbourne's Comedy Theatre in mid 2020 and Adelaide's Her Majesty's Theatre in late 2020 as part of the Adelaide Cabaret Festival but the performances were postponed due to the COVID-19 pandemic. The Australian production is produced by Louise Withers, Michael Coppel and Linda Bewick.  The production reopened on December 19, 2021, at the Sydney Opera House and ran through to April 2, 2022. Gare, Hunter, Daniele, Makan, Oka and Quan returned to the show, and joined by Phoenix Jackson Mendoza and Chelsea Dawson, replacing Zuel and Monsma as Aragon and Howard respectively, as well as swing Chiara Assetta. It then continued its Australian tour in Canberra, with stops in Adelaide and Melbourne, before returning to Sydney again, with Perth and Brisbane to follow. The show closed in February 2023 after its last run in Brisbane, with all the cast members departing.

Broadway (2020/2021–present) 
Six began Broadway previews on 13 February 2020 at the Lena Horne Theatre (then known as the Brooks Atkinson Theatre). On the day of its scheduled Broadway opening, 12 March 2020, all Broadway theatres were closed due to the COVID-19 pandemic. In May 2021, it was announced that Six would resume Broadway preview performances starting on 17 September 2021, and it officially opened on 3 October. The first new musical to open on Broadway since the beginning of the pandemic, according to Variety its opening night was both a celebration for Broadway theatre and a testament to the show's novel use of social media to propel it to international sensation pre-Broadway, especially among young people. Moss and Armitage directed the production, with choreography by Carrie-Anne Ingrouille, set design by Emma Bailey, costumes by Gabriella Slade, sound by Paul Gatehouse, lighting by Tim Deiling, and orchestrations by Tom Curran. The original Broadway cast was the same as the 2019 North American tour cast with the addition of two swings. In promotion of the show, the cast performed at the 2021 Macy's Thanksgiving Day Parade.

A cast album of the original Broadway production was announced for 2022. The live recording from the opening night was released May 6, 2022.

North American touring productions (2022–present)
In August 2019, plans emerged for a national tour of Six that would begin in Chicago. The tour was originally planned to begin at Chicago's Broadway Playhouse, but was delayed because of the COVID-19 pandemic.

The "Aragon" tour began performances at the CIBC Theatre in Chicago on 29 March 2022. The tour was initially announced with 10 stops in the first year of the tour.

In February 2022, it was announced that there were plans for a second national tour that would run concurrently to the "Aragon" tour. To distinguish between the two touring companies, this second tour was labeled the "Boleyn" tour.

The "Boleyn" tour began performances at The Smith Center in Las Vegas on 20 September 2022.

South Korea (2023) 
In December 2022, it was announced that Six would have its Asian premiere at the Shinhan Card Artium in South Korea, and would be the musical's first non-English production. The musical will open on 10 March 2023, with the cast of the UK tour performing the roles for three weeks.

Beginning 31 March 2023, a Korean cast will begin performances. The cast, which sees multiple actors splitting the roles, will include Lee Arumsoul and Son Seung-yeon as Catherine of Aragon, Kim Ji-woo and Bae Soo-jung as Anne Boleyn, Park Hye-na and Park Ga-ram as Jane Seymour, Kim Ji-sun and Choi Hyun-sun as Anna of Cleves, Kim Ryeo-won and Heo Sol-ji as Katherine Howard, and Yoo Joo-hye and Hong Ji-hui as Catherine Parr.

Canada 
On 7 March 2023, a Canadian production of Six was announced. The musical will briefly play at the Citadel Theatre in Edmonton in August 2023, before transferring for an extended run at the Royal Alexandra Theatre in Toronto.

Principal casts

Original casts

Notable replacements

West End
 Anne Boleyn: Courtney Bowman
 Katherine Howard: Sophie Isaacs
 Catherine Parr: Danielle Steers

Show co-creator Toby Marlow filled in as Catherine Parr for two West End performances on 28 July 2019 due to a cast-wide illness.

Broadway
Catherine Parr: Taylor Iman Jones

Supporting players
Included on-stage are the back-up band, known as "The Ladies in Waiting". The band provides part the accompaniment and are costumed and assume the persona of a "historical" lady-in-waiting. According to Playbill, the on-stage band members, "execute a myriad of musical cues, acting choices, and subtle choreography that further immerse the audience into the concert experience and underscore the razor-sharp wit of the show’s libretto."

Musical numbers
 "Ex-Wives" – Company
 "Ex-Wives (Reprise)" – Company †
 "No Way" – Catherine of Aragon and Company
 "Don't Lose Ur Head" – Anne Boleyn and Company
 "Heart of Stone" – Jane Seymour and Company
 "Haus of Holbein" – Company
 "Get Down" – Anna of Cleves and Company
 "All You Wanna Do" – Katherine Howard and Company
 "I Don't Need Your Love" – Catherine Parr
 "I Don't Need Your Love (Remix)" – Catherine Parr and Company ††
 "Six" – Company
 "The Megasix (Encore)" – Company †

† Not included on the studio cast recording.
†† Included as part of "I Don't Need Your Love" on the studio cast recording.

Cast recordings

Studio cast recording
Six (Studio Cast Recording) is studio album that was released digitally and on CD on August 31, 2018 through 6 Music, Loudmouth Music, and Ex-Wives Ltd. The recording peaked at number four on the UK Soundtracks chart, ten on the UK Compilation Chart, 65 on the UK Album Downloads Chart, and number two on the US Cast Albums chart. It was certified Gold in the UK in November 2021 and "Don't Lose Ur Head" was certified Silver in 2022. An instrumental "sing-along" version was released on July 30, 2019. The studio cast recording was released on vinyl for the first time on March 11, 2022.

Live original Broadway cast recording
Six: Live on Opening Night (Original Broadway Cast Recording) is a live album recorded by the original Broadway cast on their official opening night at the Lena Horne Theatre on 3 October 2021. The cast recording was released digitally on 6 May 2022. It includes all of the musical numbers in the show, as well as a bonus song by the Broadway alternates. It debuted at #1 on the Billboard's Cast Album charts, and was streamed over 3.5 million times within two weeks of its' release. The recording will be released on CD and vinyl.

Concept

Casting
Marlow and Moss lamented the lack of gender diversity within the theatre industry, which caused them to focus on themes of queerness while developing the show. They wanted a cast that was predominantly female or non-binary and the story itself to feature queer narratives in a space which normally didn't.

Historical accuracy
Six is based on real historical events and figures, but it does take artistic liberties in its portrayal of these characters. The musical incorporates some elements of historical fact, such as the marriages, divorces, and executions of the six queens. 

The show is based on historical figures with varying degrees of accuracy. Generally, the show is quite sympathetic towards its characters: for instance, it portrays Katherine Howard as a survivor of rape, which is debated amongst historians. Researchers and writers such as Suzannah Lipscomb and Gareth Russell have identified themselves as fans of the show.

Reception 
In a review of the Arts Theatre production, Dominic Cavendish of The Telegraph called the show "gloriously – persuasively – coherent, confident and inventive". Lyn Gardner of The Guardian wrote, "It may be cloaked in silliness, but Six makes some serious points about female victimhood and survival."

In a review of the Chicago production, Chris Jones of The Chicago Tribune praised the show as "dynamic" and a "blast", with a "sense of humor and spirited radicalism." Marlow and Moss are "gifted comic writers", he said, and he praised the "musical force of the intensely committed and talented actresses" in the Chicago cast. Jones suggested the show could use 10 more minutes of material that gets away from the plot's singing contest conceit, and toward the emotional center of the characters. He also thought the orchestration of the songs could be more substantial.  Jones said Six has an audience that is ready for it, in part because it gets to a complex historical paradox and treats it with verve, the memories of women in history being tied to the life of a man.

Hedy Weiss of WTTW praised the musical as "sensational", singling out each performer in the Chicago cast. Weiss also thought the show makes a convincing case for each character, and in addition to praising the writers, noted the "dynamite direction by Moss and Jamie Armitage, and powerhouse music direction by Roberta Duchak" as well as, "Gabriella Slade’s glittering costumes . . . and Tim Deiling’s arena-style lighting". According to Rachel Weinberg of Broadway World, "Six carries out [a] joyful and anachronistic takedown of the patriarchy" through the performances of a "brilliant" cast and a book and score with an inventive and sensational compositional method. Jesse Green of The New York Times wrote that the musical is "pure entertainment", the writing is "wickedly smart", the "terrific singers" of the Chicago cast sell the show "unstintingly", and the production values "befit a splashy North American premiere with Broadway backing."

The reviews for the 2021 Broadway production were positive. Green's New York Times review of the Broadway production labeled it a "Critic's Pick", calling it a "rollicking, reverberant blast from the past". Frank Rizzo of Variety said, "It may not be Masterpiece Theatre, but this 'Six' is a solid '10' for joy." Johnny Oleksinski of New York Post gave the show three stars out of a possible four calling the songs "whip-smart and catchy".

Honors and awards

Original West End production

Original Broadway production

Adaptations

Filmed stage production
In June 2022, it was announced that there would be a live recording of the stage production. All of the original West End cast members returned to reprise their roles. Tapings were held on 29 and 30 June 2022 at the Vaudeville Theatre, with audience tickets sold via a virtual lottery. The professionally filmed live recording will be released in the future.

Potential film adaptation
In October 2020, co-creators Moss and Marlow confirmed that they were "in talks" about a potential film adaptation of the musical.

SVN
After being in the Original West End cast for Six, Aimie Atkinson, Alexia McIntosh, Jarnéia Richard-Noel, Millie O'Connell, Maiya Quansah-Breed and Natalie May Paris teamed up with cast understudy Grace Mouat to launch a girl group called SVN (pronounced seven), with the band releasing singles such as "Woman" and "Free" in 2022.

Notes

References

External links
 Official Website

West End musicals
2017 musicals
British musicals
Musicals inspired by real-life events
Plays set in the 16th century
Biographical musicals
Broadway musicals
One-act musicals
Cultural depictions of Anne Boleyn
Cultural depictions of English queens
Cultural depictions of the wives of Henry VIII
Cultural depictions of English monarchs
Cultural depictions of Catherine of Aragon
Jane Seymour
Anne of Cleves
Catherine Howard
Catherine Parr
Women of the Tudor period
English ladies-in-waiting
Tony Award-winning musicals